LM-1 may refer to

Fuji LM-1 Nikko, light aircraft
Leffler-MacFarlane LM-1, glider
Light Miniature Aircraft LM-1, light aircraft
Linn LM-1, drum computer
LM-1, Lunar Module of Apollo 5